Shorja or Al-Shorja (Arabic, الشورجة) is a marketplace in Baghdad, Iraq. Located near Bab Al Sharqi market, Shorja is Baghdad's largest and oldest market.

Before the Farhud or anti-Jewish pogroms of 1941, Shorja was the primary and historic Jewish quarter of Iraq. The area east of Hennouni street was totally Jewish complete with historic synagogues and Jewish workshops and business. In 1950 and then 1968, the entire Jewish population was deported from Baghdad and Iraq. The neighborhood was renamed "Shuriyyah."

The name Shorja comes from Persian شورچاه Shurchah and means "salty well". This market place is a landmark established long ago by Iranian merchants. The adjacent neighborhood of Ab-Khana (cistern/water tank) is likewise Persian, although now Arabicized into "Aba Khana."  Both of these neighborhoods are part of the Rusafa district of eastern Baghdad in the downtown area.

During the U.S. occupation
Shorja was the site of several major attacks. The 12 February 2007 Baghdad bombings killed 76 people and injured 155–180. Near the marketplace on March 26, 2007, a suicide car bomber killed two people and injured five others. Snipers hidden in Shorjh's bazaar killed several people around the same time and gunfights erupted between militants and the Iraqi security forces in the area.

On 1 April 2007, American presidential candidate John McCain, in an effort to illustrate that the security situation had improved, visited the Shorja marketplace. The visit was criticized by the New York Times as giving a false indication of how secure the area was due to the extremely heavy security forces McCain brought with him. Indiana Representative Mike Pence was also criticized for visiting the market, under large security including helicopters overhead, and saying it was "like a normal outdoor market in Indiana in the summertime."

Al-Shorja Market

References

Baghdad